Village de Séraphin is a former Canadian open-air museum inspired by the television drama Les Belles Histoires des pays d'en haut, with more than eighteen houses to visit, located from no 300 to no 350, rue Séraphin in Sainte-Adèle.

History
In 1965, Fernand Montplaisir, a pharmacist from Sainte-Adèle, bought land where 's house was located, to build Village de Séraphin. For $50,000, he obtained the rights to use the characters of Claude-Henri Grignon.

Village de Séraphin was inaugurated in 1967, with initially eight houses bought piece by piece in the vicinity of Sainte-Adèle and rebuilt in the village. In this first season, more than 100,000 people visited the place.

In 1977, Village de Séraphin had 17 houses to visit.

Fernand Montplaisir inaugurated in 1983 a new park called Pays des Merveilles, located near the site of Village de Séraphin.

In the mid-1980s, the château de la riche héritière was built, bringing the number to eighteen houses to visit.

Following the death of her husband Fernand Montplaisir in January 1998, Thérèse Montplaisir tried to sell the village, but without success.

On May 30, 1999, Village de Séraphin was opened to the public for the last time and sold at auction.

References

External links
 Village de Séraphin
 Pictures of Village de Séraphin

Folk museums in Canada
Living museums in Canada
Open-air museums in Canada
History museums in Quebec
Relocated buildings and structures in Canada